Henry is the name of two places in the Commonwealth of Virginia in the United States of America:
Henry, Franklin County, Virginia
Henry, Sussex County, Virginia